Steers may refer to:

 Steer (cow) or bullock, castrated male cattle
 Steers (restaurant), a South African restaurant chain
 Steers (surname)
 Steers (island), a former island of Indonesia
 Kansas City Steers, American former basketball team

See also 
Steer (disambiguation)
Steer (surname)